Faneromeni School (Greek: Παρθεναγωγείο Φανερωμένης, Turkish: Faneromeni Okulu), founded by Archbishop Makarios I in 1857, was the first all-girls school in Cyprus.

The founder of the School, Archbishop Makarios I, was instrumental in the establishment of many other schools throughout the island of Cyprus in order to combat illiteracy.

The School is located in the historical Faneromeni Square, situated in the centre of the capital and within the Venetian medieval walls of Nicosia.

The School building features predominantly Greek neoclassical architectural traits, as well as, local Cypriot elements.

The Marble Mausoleum on the eastern side of Faneromeni Church is situated on the front of the building and was built in memory of four clerics executed by the Ottoman governor in 1821, following the Cypriot revolt due to the newly declared Greek War of Independence.

Today it is a co-ed school and the same building houses a nursery, primary and high schools. In 2014 it was announced that the building will be leased to house the University of Cyprus' school of Architecture.

History

The school was founded in 1852 after many efforts from the  Greek Orthodox Church and especially the Faneromeni church which is situated right in front of the school. Primarily it was used as “parthenagogeio” which means a Girls Only School (G.O.S.). The school had 115 students but only one teacher. The only way she could teach all these children was by using the help of older children as teachers-assistants for the younger ones.

As from 1903 Faneromeni School was also used for the training of the female teachers. The school took its΄ present form in 1924 with financial assistance  from the Faneromeni Church.  Nowadays the school is a public school for boys and girls. Within the same building there is a nursery school, a  primary school and a high school.

Gallery

References

External links
 School Homepage 

High schools and secondary schools in Cyprus
Educational institutions established in 1857
Education in Nicosia
Elementary and primary schools in Cyprus
1857 establishments in the Ottoman Empire